Torch of Freedom is a science fiction novel by American writers David Weber and Eric Flint, published on November 3, 2009. It is the second book in the Crown of Slaves series which runs parallel (timeline-wise) to the main Honor Harrington series. It is the sequel to the 2003 novel Crown of Slaves, also by David Weber and Eric Flint. The book includes a Baen CD Library disk.

Plot 

While Anton Zilwicki and Victor Cachat were working undercover on Mesa, Mesa launches an attack at Torch. Anton Zilwicki and Victor Cachat escape Mesa amidst general mayhem together with a defecting leading scientist. The attack against Torch is thwarted by Rear Admiral Luiz Rozsak of the Solarian League Navy, who had amassed a fleet in the interest of the Maya Sector.

Queen Berry becomes romantically involved with Hugh Arai, who, after being freed from slavery by Jeremy X from the Audubon Ballroom, worked as a commando for the Beowulf Biological Survey Corps (BSC), and was assigned by Jeremy X as Berry's bodyguard.

References

External links 
 Torch of Freedom on author's website
 The Galley Proof site for Torch of Freedom, Chapters 1 to 24 as of this writing.
 A similar sample page at Baen Books.
 The actual schedule page at Baen, esp. November '09.

Novels by David Weber
Novels by Eric Flint
Honorverse books
2009 American novels